Downtown Columbia is the central business, government, and social core of Columbia, Missouri and the Columbia Metropolitan Area.  Three colleges — the University of Missouri, Stephens College, and Columbia College — all border the area. Downtown Columbia is an area of approximately one square mile surrounded by the University of Missouri on the south, Stephens College to the east, and Columbia College on the north. The area serves as Columbia's financial and business district and is the topic of a large initiative to draw tourism, which includes plans to capitalize on the area's historic architecture and Bohemian characteristics. The downtown skyline is relatively low and is dominated by the 10-story Tiger Hotel, built in 1928, and the 15-story Paquin Tower.

Downtown Columbia Historic District, listed on the National Register of Historic Places, covers much of the downtown area.  This historic district was created in 2006, following the removal of concrete awnings. It was expanded in 2008.

On the northeast side of Downtown is the North Village Arts District. The Flat Branch of Hinkson Creek runs through downtown. Peace Park is located on Elm Street.

Gallery

References

External links
Downtown Special Business District

Historic districts on the National Register of Historic Places in Missouri
Columbia, Missouri
Neoclassical architecture in Missouri
Beaux-Arts architecture in Missouri
Neighborhoods in Columbia, Missouri
Buildings and structures in Columbia, Missouri
National Register of Historic Places in Boone County, Missouri